Agustín Squella Narducci (born 1944) is a Chilean lawyer who was elected as a member of the Chilean Constitutional Convention.

References

External links
 

Living people
1944 births
20th-century Chilean lawyers
21st-century Chilean politicians
University of Chile alumni
Complutense University of Madrid alumni
Academic staff of the University of Valparaíso
Heads of universities in Chile 
Members of the Chilean Constitutional Convention
People from Santiago